Ready to Run is a 2000 Disney Channel Original Movie.

Plot

Ready to Run is the story of 14-year-old Corrie Ortiz (Krissy Perez), an energetic girl who dreams of becoming a jockey in the predominantly male sport of Thoroughbred horse racing. Although her father died in a racing-related accident, and her mother is against it, Corrie's spirited memory drives her to try to achieve her goal.

She also has the gift her grandmother calls the "confidence of horses". It allows Corrie to communicate with her horse, Thunder Jam (TJ), who lives dispiritedly in his sire's shadow. Though TJ is an excellent runner, he has an immense fear of the starting gates.

To conquer this fear, the team employs the strange tactic of placing headphones over TJ's ears. Surprisingly, the music works. TJ can now get through the gate with confidence. The headphones later become a trademark of Thunder Jam as he wins more and more races. B. Moody (Jason Dohring), an ex-circus rider, is picked up as the jockey, however, an accident caused by Thunder Jam's competition leaves Moody injured and unable to compete, thus forcing Corrie to step in and take his place.

At the final race of the season their toughest opponent is doing everything he can to see that he wins. He takes it up with the judges that the headphones on TJ's ears are stimulating the horse in some rule breaking manner and should be disallowed.

Dismayed, Corrie and TJ have to run the race without their signature item. After a rough start, Moody ingeniously puts TJ's music over the race course's loud speakers, and TJ, made confident by the familiar song, goes on to win the fictional Gold Rush Derby.

Cast
 Krissy Perez as Corrie Ortiz
 Jason Dohring as B. Moody
 Lillian Hurst as Lourdes Ortiz
 Jon Brazier as Max Garris
 Nestor Serrano as Hector Machado
 Theresa Saldana as Sonja Ortiz
 Sinbad as Voice of "Hollywood Shuffle"
 Paul Rodriguez as Voice of "T.J."
 Rick Ducommun as Voice of "Cyclone"
 Cristian Guerrero as Gabby Ortiz
 Mark Clare as James McCaffery
 Stephen Tozer as Bob Bethell
 Maggie Harper as Dr. Lucy Huckaby
 Michael Saccente as Homer Flannigan
 John Sumner as Supervisor Pete

External links
 

2000 television films
2000 films
Disney Channel Original Movie films
Films about horses
American horse racing films
American television films
Films about women's sports
Films directed by Duwayne Dunham
2000s American films